The Felix Dzerzhinsky Political-Military Academy – was a Soviet style military academy, established by the communist government, in the People's Republic of Poland. It operated in Warsaw from 1951 until 1990, and was an institution with high school status, founded for indoctrination of higher command of military forces of Communist Poland. The alumni of the Political-Military Academy became political commissars in the Army.

History
The Academy was opened on March 22, 1951, in the campus that had been used by the Academy of Political Officers at Rembertow. On July 18, 1951 it was named after Felix Dzerzhinsky. Soon afterwards, it was moved to former Europejski Hotel in the center of Warsaw, and in 1954 it was moved again, to the campus of Academy of Polish Army Headquarters, located on Opaczewska Street.

The Academy’s structure was based on Moscow’s V.I. Lenin Political-Military Academy, as its founder, Colonel Jan Hoffman was its graduate. Most of its staff were officers of the former Academy of Political Officers, as well as a group of Red Army political officers. Among lecturers were Jerzy Wiatr, Tadeusz Kotarbinski, Stefan Michnik, and Stanislaw Kania.
 
In the first years of existence, the Academy had eight faculties: 
 History of Poland and Polish Workers’ Movement,
 History of the World and International Workers’ Movement,
 History of Wars and Warfare,
 History of Tactics and Headquarters,
 History of War Geography,
 History of Political Economics,
 History of Marxism–Leninism,
 History of Party and Political Work.

In 1954, the Military-Legal Faculty was added. In December 1958, the faculties of History and Pedagogy were added, and in early 1961, the Military Legal Institute was opened within the Academy. In 1966, the Center of Social Studies was opened.

The Academy was dissolved on May 21, 1990, and most of its campus was transferred to Warsaw University.

Structure
Command
Teaching units
Faculty of Education and Politics
Historical and Political Department
Economic and Military Department
Military Institute of Law
Foreign Language Center
Center for Social Research
Branch of Organization and Training Planning
Science and Research Department
HR Department
Finance Department
school Divisions
Security Sub-units

Commanders
Michał Stankiewicz (1951-1954)
Jan Hoffman (1954-1956)
Adam Uziembło (1956-1958)
Józef Urbanowicz (1958-1960)
Eugeniusz Kuszko (1960-1965)
Edward Braniewski (1965-1969)
Henryk Koczara (1969-1972)
Władysław Polański (1972-1989)
Mieczysław Michalik (1989-1990)

Notable Professors
 Czesław Madajczyk
 Julian Polan-Haraschin
 Stanisław Herbst
 Jerzy Wiatr
 Jan Szczepański

Notable alumni
Janusz Bojarski

References

1951 establishments in Poland
Educational institutions established in 1951
1990 disestablishments in Poland
Polish People's Republic
Defunct universities and colleges in Poland
Universities and colleges in Warsaw
Stalinism in Poland
Military education and training in Poland